In geometry, the rhombidodecadodecahedron is a nonconvex uniform polyhedron, indexed as U38. It has 54 faces (30 squares, 12 pentagons and 12 pentagrams), 120 edges and 60 vertices. It is given a Schläfli symbol t0,2, and by the Wythoff construction this polyhedron can also be named a cantellated great dodecahedron.

Cartesian coordinates 
Cartesian coordinates for the vertices of a uniform great rhombicosidodecahedron are all the even permutations of

 (±1/τ2, 0, ±τ2)
 (±1, ±1, ±)
 (±2, ±1/τ, ±τ)

where τ = (1+)/2 is the golden ratio (sometimes written φ).

Related polyhedra 

It shares its vertex arrangement with the uniform compounds of 10 or 20 triangular prisms. It additionally shares its edges with the icosidodecadodecahedron (having the pentagonal and pentagrammic faces in common) and the rhombicosahedron (having the square faces in common).

Medial deltoidal hexecontahedron

The medial deltoidal hexecontahedron (or midly lanceal ditriacontahedron) is a nonconvex isohedral polyhedron. It is the dual of the rhombidodecadodecahedron. It has 60 intersecting quadrilateral faces.

See also 
 List of uniform polyhedra

References

External links 
 
 
 Uniform polyhedra and duals

Uniform polyhedra